Veronika Borisovna Dudarova (January 15, 2009) was a Soviet and Russian conductor, the first woman to succeed as conductor of symphony orchestras in the 20th century. She became a conductor of the Moscow State Symphony Orchestra in 1947, and led this and other orchestras for sixty years. In 1991, she founded the Symphony Orchestra of Russia.

Dudarova was born in Baku to an ethnic Ossetian, formerly aristocratic, family. She attended the school of music in Baku (class of Stephan Strasser), the piano department of the Leningrad Conservatory (1933–1937), and the conductors' department of the Moscow Conservatory (1939–1947).

For thirteen years, from 1947 until 1960, Dudarova was a junior conductor at the Moscow State Symphony Orchestra; in 1960, she took over as the principal conductor and led the orchestra until 1989. She led the Symphony Orchestra of Russia from 1991 to 2003 and retained the role of artistic manager of the orchestra until her death in Moscow in January 2009.

In 1977, she was awarded the title of People's Artist of the USSR.

In the 1987 documentary A Woman Is a Risky Bet: Six Orchestra Conductors, directed by Christina Olofson, Dudarova conducts the Moscow State Symphony Orchestra and Choir in a performance of Mozart's Requiem. The main-belt asteroid 9737 Dudarova was named after her.

According to her son Mikhail, during a concert in Andorra in 1993, due to her intense style of conducting, Dudarova fell from the podium but went on conducting the orchestra lying on the floor leaning on her right hand and the piece was performed to the end without an interruption.

References

External links

"Дударова Вероника Борисовна" (Dudarova, Veronika Borisovna), Great Soviet Encyclopedia 

Soviet conductors (music)
Women conductors (music)
People's Artists of the USSR
Musicians from Baku
Ossetian people
1916 births
2009 deaths
Burials in Troyekurovskoye Cemetery
20th-century Russian conductors (music)